Angel Heart is a 1987 horror movie, written and directed by Alan Parker.

Angel Heart may also refer to:

 Angel Heart, a Japanese media franchise:
 Angel Heart (manga), comic series by Tsukasa Hōjō
 Angel Heart (anime), animated television series
 Angel Heart (2015 TV series), a live-action Japanese drama series based on the manga by Tsukasa Hōjō
 Angel Heart (Bonnie Tyler album), 1992 release by singer Bonnie Tyler
 Angel Heart (Jimmy Webb album), 1982 release by the American songwriter
 "Angel Heart", a song on this album